Ujiogba is a community located in Esan West Local Government Area of Edo State, South South Nigeria. The community is headed by an "onojie" shares boundary with Ogwa community and Ehor Village. The community is largely an agrarian society and dominated by the Ishan speaking people of Edo State.

References 

Populated places in Edo State